Legal Positivism (Il Positivismo Giuridico) is a book by the Italian jurist Norberto Bobbio about one of the ontological elements of foundations of law — the jusphilosophical school called juspositivism or legal positivism.

Importance
Seen by scholars as an important work in understanding of a conceptual constructivist approach of the scientific way of thinking law in the new era of the jurisprudence of values, Bobbio's book faces this challenge in eleven chapters.

Chapters

Part I
Introduction: natural law and positive law in thinking along the history

 Historical predecessors, relation between natural and positive law, the history context of the legal positivism, common law and civil law
 The historical law school as predecessor; Thibaut versus Savigny about the codification of  law in Germany
 The Napoleonic Code in France; the exegesis school; Portalis
 The origins of legal positivism in Germany; Bentham and Austin; the illuminist inspiration; Jhering's method of the juridical science

Part 2
Introduction: the main points of the juspositivism doctrine

 Positivism as non-value  judgments; legal realism and legal positivism; formalism and legal positivism
 Definition of law as enforcement; Thomasius; Kant; Jhering; Ross
 Sources of law; judicial decisions as sources of law; equity; nature of things (Natur der Sache); uses and habits
 Imperative theory; Austin; Thon
 The theory of legal order
 The interpretation function of jurisprudence; integration and analogy
 Positivism as ideology; legal order as value of law

Criticism
"The legal positivism considers only what is put by the State. Its basic thesis is that the law is product of human action and desire and no more of the divine natural or rational as affirmed formerly by the jusnaturalism. Various authors also defend that there isn't necessarily a relation between law, moral and justice, because notions of justice and moral are time and space dependent and without political power to support them and impose them against who creates the juridical norms"

"Legal Positivism of Norberto Bobbio, shows us the final and most advanced reading of the legal positivism"Bobbio, about the first jusphilosophers of legal positivism, rhapsodizing a metaphor attributed to Newton, described himself as a dwarf on the shoulder of a giant, in the sense that 'If we are on the shoulder of a giant, we can see more than even the giants themselves, but if there weren't the giants, we couldn't achieve that height'".

Bibliography
Bobbio, Norberto. Il Positivismo Giuridico'', 3rd edition. Torino: G. Giapichelli, 1996,

See also
Jurisprudence of values
Natural law
Juridical system
Rule of law

References

1979 non-fiction books
Contemporary philosophical literature
Italian-language books
Italian non-fiction books
Law books
Philosophy of law
Political philosophy literature
Legal positivism